The Rhodes Lynx football team represents Rhodes College in Memphis, Tennessee. The Lynx participate at the NCAA Division III level and are members of the Southern Athletic Association (SAA).  The team's head coach is Rich Duncan.

Notables
 Tom Mullady '79 – New York Giants tight end, 1979 to 1984
 DJ Coker '19 – Houston Texans offensive line, 2019; Calgary Stampeders offensive line, 2020 to present
 Henry Hammond '36 – Chicago Bears end (1937)

References

 
American football teams established in 1896
1896 establishments in Tennessee